The FA Cup 1988–89 is the 108th season of the world's oldest football knockout competition; The Football Association Challenge Cup, or FA Cup for short. The large number of clubs entering the tournament from lower down the English football league system meant that the competition started with a number of preliminary and qualifying rounds. The 28 victorious teams from the Fourth Round Qualifying progressed to the First Round Proper.

Preliminary round

Ties

Replays

2nd replays

3rd replay

1st qualifying round

Ties

Replays

2nd replays

2nd qualifying round

Ties

Replays

2nd replays

3rd qualifying round

Ties

Replays

2nd replays

4th qualifying round
The teams that given byes to this round are Newport County, Runcorn, Kidderminster Harriers, Sutton United, Macclesfield Town, Altrincham, Welling United, Aylesbury United, Chorley, Yeovil Town, Dagenham, Bognor Regis Town, Farnborough Town, Whitby Town, Chelmsford City, Slough Town, V S Rugby, Caernarfon Town, Burton Albion and Halesowen Town.

Ties

Replays

2nd replays

1988–89 FA Cup
See 1988-89 FA Cup for details of the rounds from the First Round Proper onwards.

External links
Football Club History Database: FA Cup 1988–89
FA Cup Past Results

Qual
FA Cup qualifying rounds